Samaspur Bird Sanctuary is a protected area situated near Salon in Raebareli district, Uttar Pradesh, India, about 122 km from Lucknow on Lucknow-Varanasi highway. It was established in 1987 on about 780 hectares of land. The nearest railway station is Unchahar and the nearest airport is Fursatganj. More than 250 varieties of birds can be seen there, some of which travel more than 5000 km to get there, including the greylag goose, pintail, common teal, Eurasian wigeon, northern shoveler, and ruddy shelduck (Surkhab). Local birds include the knob-billed duck, lesser whistling-duck, Indian spot-billed duck, Eurasian spoonbill, kingfishers, and vultures. There are twelve varieties of fish in the lake at Samaspur.

References

External links
www.india9.com/i9show/Samaspur-Bird-Sanctuary-23359.htm

Bird sanctuaries of Uttar Pradesh
Ramsar sites in India
Raebareli district
1987 establishments in Uttar Pradesh
Protected areas established in 1987